Macaronichnus is an ichnogenus of trace fossil.

The environmental preferences of Macaronichnus are high-energy foreshores and shallow shorefaces. Macaronichnus is an indicator of temperate to cold waters.

See also
 Ichnology

References

External links
 Chuck D. Howell's Ichnogenera Photos

Trace fossils